News24 is a Bangladeshi Bengali-language satellite and cable pay television channel dedicated to news programming. It began broadcasts on 28 July 2016, and is owned by East West Media Group, a subsidiary of Bashundhara Group. News24 is based in the Bashundhara Residential Area in Baridhara.

History
In November 2013, the Bangladesh Telecommunication Regulatory Commission granted Bashundhara Group's East West Media Group a broadcasting license to operate News24. It received its frequency allocation in January 2015. Its logo was officially revealed in February 2016. The channel began test broadcasts on 26 March 2016. News24 was one of the nine Bangladeshi television channels to sign an agreement with Bdnews24.com to subscribe to a video-based news agency run by children called Prism in May 2016. The channel officially went on the air on 28 July 2016. News24 commenced high-definition broadcasts on 1 February 2021. News24 revamped its logo on 26 March 2021.

Organisation
Sayem Sobhan is the managing director of News24. Shahnaz Munni is the chief news editor. Naem Nizam was the CEO of this tv channel since its starting telecast. On Nov, 2021 he was relieved from his position.

See also
 List of television stations in Bangladesh

References

Television channels and stations established in 2016
Television channels in Bangladesh
2016 establishments in Bangladesh
Mass media in Dhaka
24-hour television news channels in Bangladesh